Isaac Tichenor (February 8, 1754December 11, 1838) was an American lawyer and politician. He served as the third and fifth governor of Vermont and United States Senator from Vermont.

Biography
Tichenor was born in Newark in the Province of New Jersey, the son of Susanna (Guerin) and Daniel Tichenor. He graduated from Princeton University in 1775 and moved for a short while to Schenectady, New York where he studied law.  He was a descendant of Martin Tichenor (1625–1681), an early colonist and original settler of Newark, New Jersey.

Career
In 1777, Tichenor moved to Bennington, Vermont and served as an Assistant Commissary General during the American Revolution.  He was elected captain and commander of a Bennington militia company, which was activated for service several times in Vermont and upstate New York.  He was also appointed a justice of the peace.

He was a member of the Vermont House of Representatives from 1781 to 1784 and served as Speaker of the House in 1783. He was an agent from the Vermont Republic to the Continental Congress, and presented Vermont's request for admission to the Union from 1782 to 1789.

After Vermont's admission to the Union in 1791, Tichenor ran unsuccessfully for a seat in the United States House of Representatives against Matthew Lyon and Israel Smith, receiving 29% of the vote in the first round. He was an associate justice of the Vermont Supreme Court from 1791 to 1794, and Chief Justice in 1795 and 1796.

Tichenor was also active in the Vermont militia, and attained the rank of major general as commander of its 2nd Division.

In 1796 he was elected to fill the unexpired term of Moses Robinson in the United States Senate beginning on October 18, 1796.  He was re-elected to a full six-year term to begin on March 4, 1797, but he resigned on October 17, 1797, when he was elected Governor of Vermont.

Tichenor was a member of the Federalist Party; when that party dominated the federal government in the 1790s many leading politicians in Vermont joined the Democratic-Republican Party and opposed a strong federal government at the national level.  Despite dominating the Governor's office for a decade, Tichenor's elections reflected the decline of the Federalist Party as a whole, as he won by increasingly narrow margins.  After his last consecutive victory in 1806, he lost in 1807, won narrowly won 1808, and lost in 1809, 1810, and 1817 by increasing margins.

In 1815, Tichenor returned to the United States Senate, where he served until 1821.  By the end of his term the Federalist Party had ceased to exist.

Death
After completing his Senate term, Tichenor lived in retirement in Bennington.  He died in Bennington on December 11, 1838, and was interred at Bennington Village Cemetery. He was the last surviving Governor to have served in the 18th century.

References

Further reading
Crockett, Walter H., "Isaac Tichenor", Vermonters: A Book of Biographies, Brattleboro: Stephen Daye Press, 1931, pp. 220–223.

External links

 govtrack.us
 The Political Graveyard
 National Governors Association
 
 Vermont History and Genealogy: Men of Vermont – Isaac Tichenor

1754 births
1838 deaths
Princeton University alumni
People of Vermont in the American Revolution
American militia generals
Vermont lawyers
Governors of Vermont
United States senators from Vermont
People from Bennington, Vermont
Vermont Federalists
Federalist Party United States senators
Members of the Vermont House of Representatives
Speakers of the Vermont House of Representatives
People of pre-statehood Vermont
Justices of the Vermont Supreme Court
Burials in Vermont
Federalist Party state governors of the United States
19th-century American lawyers